Kristjan-Eduard Jalak (21 March 1882 Kastre Parish, Kreis Dorpat – 8 September 1944 Leningrad) was an Estonian politician, a member of the Communist Party of Estonia. He was a member of VI Riigikogu (its Chamber of Deputies).

References

1882 births
1944 deaths
People from Kastre Parish
People from Kreis Dorpat
Communist Party of Estonia politicians
Members of the Riigivolikogu
Members of the Supreme Soviet of the Estonian Soviet Socialist Republic, 1940–1947